Lepo Sumera (8 May 1950 – 2 June 2000) was an Estonian composer and teacher.

Life and career
He was born in Tallinn and  studied with Veljo Tormis in his teens, and from 1968, with Heino Eller at the Estonian Academy of Music and Theatre (then Tallinn State Conservatory). After Heino Eller's death in 1970, he studied with Heino Jürisalu, graduating in 1973. He then did postgraduate study at the Moscow Conservatory (1979–1982) with the Russian composer Roman Ledenev. Sumera first came to notice in 1972 with In Memoriam, an orchestral tribute to Eller.

Legacy
He is considered one of Estonia's most renowned composers along with Eller, Eduard Tubin and Arvo Pärt, he was also his country's Minister of Culture from 1988 to 1992 during the days of the Singing Revolution. As such he was the last Minister of Culture of the Estonian SSR, and the first Minister of Culture after Estonia re-gained independence.

See also
20th-century classical music
Culture of Estonia

References

External links
Lepo Sumera official web site
Lepo Sumera on IMDb
Lepo Sumera on AllMusic

1950 births
2000 deaths
Estonian Academy of Music and Theatre alumni
Tallinn Music High School alumni
Government ministers of Estonia
Musicians from Tallinn
Moscow Conservatory alumni
20th-century Estonian composers
Burials at Metsakalmistu
People's commissars and ministers of the Estonian Soviet Socialist Republic